Christopher or Chris Jones may refer to:

Arts, entertainment and culture
Christopher Jones (actor) (1941–2014), American actor
Christopher Jones (comics) (born 1969), American comic book artist
Chris Jones (drama critic) (born 1963), American journalist and drama critic
Chris Jones (filmmaker), British filmmaker, author, film director, screenwriter and educator
Christopher Michael Jones (born 1969), American hip hop and R&B record producer
Christopher Jones (actor, born 1982), American actor and dancer
Chris Jones (British singer) (born 1985), British singer and songwriter
Chris Jones (American musician) (1958–2005), American musician and composer
Chris Jones (bluegrass musician), American singer/guitarist, leader of the Night Drivers

Politics
Stephen Christopher Jones (born 1958), American politician in the Virginia House of Delegates
Christopher M. Jones (politician) 2022 Arkansas gubernatorial candidate

Software developer
Chris Jones (Access Software) (born 1955), co-creator of the Tex Murphy detective adventure game series
Chris Jones (game developer), founder of Obsidian Entertainment, a computer game company

Sports

Baseball
Chris Jones (1980s outfielder) (born 1957), former outfielder in Major League Baseball, 1985–1986
Chris Jones (1990s outfielder) (born 1965), former outfielder in Major League Baseball, 1991–2000

Basketball
Chris Jones (basketball, born 1991), American basketball player
Chris Jones (basketball, born 1993), American basketball player

Cricket
Chris Jones (cricketer) (born 1990), English cricketer
Christopher Jones (cricketer) (born 1973), former English cricketer

Association football
Chris Jones (footballer, born 1989), Welsh footballer
Chris Jones (footballer, born 1956), Jersey born England under-21 international footballer
Chris Jones (footballer, born 1945), English footballer
Chris Roosevelt Jones (born 1991), Liberian footballer

Gridiron football
Chris Jones (center) (born 1964), American football player
Chris Jones (cornerback) (born 1995), American football player
Chris Jones (punter) (born 1989), American football player for the Dallas Cowboys
Chris Jones (defensive tackle, born 1990), American football defensive tackle who is currently a free agent
Chris Jones (defensive tackle, born 1994), American football defensive tackle for the Kansas City Chiefs
Chris Jones (wide receiver, born 1972), American player of Canadian football
Chris Jones (wide receiver, born 1982), Canadian football wide receiver
Chris Jones (Canadian football coach) (born 1967), head coach and general manager of the Saskatchewan Roughriders of the Canadian Football League
Chris T. Jones (born 1971), former American football player for the Philadelphia Eagles

Rugby
Chris Jones (rugby union) (born 1980), English rugby union footballer
Chris Jones (rugby, born 1982), English rugby league and rugby union player for Leeds Tykes

Other sports
Chris Jones (gymnast) (born 1987), British gymnast
Christopher Jones (water polo) (1884–1937), British gold medalist in the 1920 Olympics
Chris Jones (sprinter) (born 1973), American sprint athlete
Christopher Jones (cyclist) (born 1979), American cyclist
Chris Jones (racing driver) (born 1987), American racing driver

Others
Christopher Jones (Mayflower captain) (c. 1570–1622), English sailor, master of the Mayflower
Christopher Jones (Anglican bishop) (born 1964), Australian Anglican assistant bishop in the Anglican Diocese of Tasmania
Christopher Jones (bishop) (1936–2018), Irish Roman Catholic prelate, Bishop of Elphin
Christopher Jones (biologist) (born 1976), American naturalist, inventor and writer on evolutionary medicine
Chris Braithwaite, aka "Chris Jones" (c. 1885–1944), Barbadian-born sailor and London unionist
Christopher Darnell Jones Jr., perpetrator of the 2022 University of Virginia shooting
Christopher W. Jones, American chemical engineer and researcher

See also
Jones (surname)